Ficus obtusifolia is a species of tree in the family Moraceae. It is found in North and South America.

Description 
Trees up to 45 m tall, stranglers or independent; trunks mostly unbuttressed. Leaves obovate or oblanceolate, 15–25 cm long. Figs globose, 1.5–3 cm in diameter.

References

obtusifolia
Trees of Mexico
Trees of Peru
Trees of Nicaragua
Trees of Brazil
Trees of Bolivia
Trees of Venezuela